Noel Solomon (born 21 December 1971) is an Australian former professional rugby league footballer who played in the 1990s. Primarily a half, he played for the North Sydney Bears and North Queensland Cowboys.

Playing career
A Townsville junior of Torres Strait Islander descent, Solomon made his first grade debut for the North Sydney Bears in Round 15 of the 1992 NSWRL season. In 1993, he became a regular for the Bears, playing 21 of the club's 22 games, starting 17 of them at halfback. In 1994, Solomon played just five games for North Sydney, which included coming off the bench in a preliminary final loss to the Canberra Raiders.

In 1995, Solomon returned to Townsville, joining the newly-established North Queensland Cowboys. He came off the bench in the club's inaugural game against the Sydney Bulldogs. Solomon played just six games for the Cowboys before being sacked in May for disciplinary breaches. In 1996, he played for the Mackay Sea Eagles in the Queensland Cup.

Statistics

NSWRL/ARL

References

1971 births
Living people
Australian rugby league players
Indigenous Australian rugby league players
North Sydney Bears players
North Queensland Cowboys players
Rugby league five-eighths
Rugby league halfbacks
Rugby league players from Townsville
Torres Strait Islanders